The Flames Lie (German: Die Flammen lügen) is a 1926 German silent drama film directed by Carl Froelich and starring Hans Adalbert Schlettow, Ruth Weyher and Henny Porten. It was shot at the Staaken Studios in Berlin. The film's sets were designed by Franz Schroedter. It was made by UFA and released under the Parufamet agreement.

Cast
 Hans Adalbert Schlettow as Konrad Birkinger  
 Ruth Weyher as Doritt Lenee, seine Freundin  
 Henny Porten as Gertrud von Gehr  
 Paul Bildt as Erwin von Gehr, Gertruds Vater  
 Gerd Briese as Hermann von Gehr, Gertruds Bruder  
 Grete Mosheim as Anne von Berke  
 Ferdinand von Alten as Arken, Birkingers Privatsekretär  
 Hubert von Meyerinck as Ein Liebhaber  
 Lotte Steinhoff

References

Bibliography
 Grange, William. Cultural Chronicle of the Weimar Republic. Scarecrow Press, 2008.

External links

1926 films
Films of the Weimar Republic
German silent feature films
Films directed by Carl Froelich
1926 drama films
German drama films
German black-and-white films
UFA GmbH films
Silent drama films
Films shot at Staaken Studios
1920s German films
1920s German-language films